The Void Cube is a 3-D mechanical puzzle similar to a Rubik's Cube, with the notable difference being that the center pieces are missing, which causes the puzzle to resemble a level 1 Menger sponge. The core used on the Rubik's Cube is also absent, creating holes straight through the cube on all three axes. Due to the restricted volume of the puzzle it employs an entirely different structural mechanism from a regular Rubik's Cube, though the possible moves are the same. The Void Cube was invented by Katsuhiko Okamoto. Gentosha Education, in Japan, holds the license to manufacture official Void Cubes. These official designs are also sold under the Rubik's brand, owned by Spin Master Ltd., and workalikes are available from a variety of manufacturers. Speed-solving the Void Cube is common in exhibition but is not an official World Cube Association competition event.

Solution

The Void Cube is slightly more difficult than a regular Rubik's Cube. The first additional challenge is that the missing centers remove a key reference for the color of each solved face, requiring deduction of the arrangement of face colors from the corner pieces (or rote memorization of the solved cube's color arrangement). This is similar to the challenge presented by even-numbered NxN puzzle cubes, such as the 2x2 and 4x4, that also have no piece in the exact center of any face. 

The second added challenge is that the Void Cube allows odd parity transformations, which are impossible on a regular 3x3 cube. The lack of center cubes alters the parity considerations. A 90˚ rotation of a face either on the regular Rubik's Cube or on the Void Cube swaps the positions of eight cubes in two, odd parity, four cycles. Overall, a face turn is an even permutation. On the regular cube a 90˚ rotation of the whole cube about a principal axis swaps the positions of 24 cubes in six, odd parity, four cycles. On the regular cube a whole cube rotation is an even permutation. On the other hand, lacking center cubes, a 90˚ whole cube rotation on the Void Cube swaps 20 cubes in five, odd parity, four cycles. Thus, a whole cube rotation on the Void Cube is an odd permutation. In consequence, on the Void Cube turning the faces of the cube together with whole cube rotations can produce an arrangement where two pieces are swapped and the rest are in their original positions. This and other odd parity arrangements are not possible on the regular Rubik's Cube and require the solver to recognize and adapt to the novel permutations, which occur in roughly half of all solve attempts from random scrambles. These permutations are solvable with a number of simple algorithms.
 
To see the relationship between parity on the regular cube and the void cube, consider the regular cube.  A regular cube solution takes a scrambled cube to the identity cube where the color of all the edge and corner facelets match the center facelets.  A void cube solution takes a scrambled cube to an arrangement where the color of the edge and corner facelets match each other regardless of the color of the center facelet.  These "cat's eye" arrangements are formed by rotating the edge and corner cubes as a whole with respect to the center cubes.  This may be done in 24 different ways but because of parity only 12 may be formed by turning the faces of the cube.  Odd parity void cube positions are formed on odd parity "cat's eye" regular cube positions. Because the center facelets are missing - and therefore functionally identical - on a void cube, it is difficult to detect whether the cube is being solved into an even or odd parity state until well into the solve attempt; when using the most common "beginner" or "CFOP" methods, it is often not apparent until solving the last layer.

Internal mechanism 

The parts of a Void Cube are:
 20 pieces
 8 corner pieces
 12 edge (middle) pieces
 6 internal support pieces with the square hole through them
 12 mostly-hidden internal sliding pieces with several functions

Essentially, the "frame" of the mechanism comprises six identical pieces with square holes, replacing the structure otherwise provided by the center pieces. Part of the interior of each hole is the inside surface of these pieces. Say that one of them is lying separately on a work surface, "exterior" side facing up. Looking straight down at one of these pieces (so the line of sight is parallel to that face's rotational axis) its exterior is also square.

Seen from a more-typical oblique position, however, each side of a square piece is somewhat akin to a low arch that joins neighboring corners. The low part of that arch engages mostly-hidden internal sliding pieces that (among other functions) support the edge cubies. The high surface of the arch includes convex curved circular flanges that engage grooves inside the cubies, to hold the structure together.

When all faces of the puzzle are in their normal aligned state, these six pieces are akin to the sides of an internal cube. Each one is free to rotate without any obstruction from the other five pieces. When a face is rotated, its own square piece also rotates with that face's cubies, but that square piece's own flanges do not move relative to the cubies.

What retains the cubies when a face is rotated is the set of four curved flanges on the four neighboring square-hole pieces. Grooves inside the cubies fit over those flanges. Edge cubie grooves engage flanges on neighboring square pieces, thus keeping them together.

As described so far, however, the individual parts of the mechanism would move out of position easily. Each edge of the puzzle therefore includes a mostly-hidden sliding piece (already mentioned) with a complex shape that includes a curved dovetail surface. This surface is widest at its innermost extension, and in the center of the piece along its length.
The dovetail of this piece, acting somewhat like a wedge, keeps neighboring square pieces spaced apart.

Keeping the square pieces apart ensures that the grooves inside the cubies stay engaged with the flanges. Close manufacturing tolerances result in sufficient friction to keep parts of the puzzle from moving on their own, but also
still allow easy movement.

Edge cubies fit onto positioning lugs on the exteriors of these internal sliding pieces, so that rotating a face makes its edge cubies push the sliding pieces around in a circle. The interior surfaces that face inward toward the hole drive this face's square piece so that it rotates with the cubies.

The square pieces ensure that these internal sliding pieces stay toward the edges of the puzzle.

Edge cubies in their normal position are retained by the flanges of neighboring square pieces. Corner cubies are retained by a trio of short circular flanges at the ends of the interior sliding pieces. When a face is rotated, those short flanges temporarily retain edge cubies, particularly when the face is rotated about 1/8 of a turn (roughly 45 degrees). As well, the corner cubies are temporarily retained by the curved flanges on the neighboring square pieces.
During a rotation, flanges "change roles" as cubies travel along their circular paths.

This internal mechanism is a necessary compromise, as the resulting visual look of the puzzle can be accomplished in no other way. However, the lack of the central core common to most traditional cubes, and the skeletonization of what would normally be the center pieces attached to this core, typically create a puzzle with relatively high friction, low durability and less forgiving turning behavior than a traditional speed cube. Those who desire a smoother puzzle with the same behavior can instead use a simple "sticker mod" of a standard 3x3 puzzle cube. By removing the stickers from each center piece (or, on a stickerless cube, by replacing the center caps with black plastic), the puzzle behaves identically to a "true" void cube in solving, while trading the unique aesthetic for the advantages in feel, speed and durability of modern 3x3 speed cubes.

See also
 Holey Megaminx

References

External links

Rubik's Cube
Mechanical puzzle cubes